Francesca Monnaie (born 1987) is a Seychelles politician who served as Leader of the Opposition in the National Assembly from 17 May 2016 until 27 September 2016. She was Secretary-General of the Popular Democratic Movement (PDM) from 2011 to 2016.

Parliament 
Francesca Monnaie was the Secretary-General of the Popular Democratic Movement (PDM) party from its founding in 2011. In the 2011 parliamentary election, she was the PDM candidate for Bel Ombre. Although the PDM did not win constituency seats, it was allocated one proportional list seat in the National Assembly. PDM leader David Pierre took this seat, and became Leader of the Opposition as the sole opposition member. 

In 2016, Pierre resigned as PDM leader; Secretary-General Monnaie became interim leader of the party. Pierre then also resigned from the Assembly. Monnaie was sworn in to take the PDM seat on 17 May 2016. Besides serving on several parliamentary committees, she chaired the Finance & Public Accounts Committee. 

The PDM did not participate in the 2016 parliamentary election. Wavel Ramkalawan returned as Leader of the Opposition in the new Assembly.

References 

Living people
1987 births
Members of the National Assembly (Seychelles)
Seychellois women in politics